Broadwick Street (formerly Broad Street) is a street in Soho, City of Westminster, London. It runs for 0.18 miles (0.29 km) approximately west–east between Marshall Street and Wardour Street, crossing Berwick Street.

Broad Street was notorious as the centre of an 1854 outbreak of cholera. Dr John Snow traced the outbreak to a public water pump on the street, and disabled the pump. Before this time, the disease was widely thought to be caused by air-borne 'miasma'; Snow's findings showed it to be water-borne.

A replica pump, together with an explanatory plaque, was erected close to the original location in 1992. The original pump was at the junction of Broad Street and Cambridge Street (today Lexington Street), close to the back wall of what today is the 'John Snow' pub. The site is subtly marked with a pink granite kerbstone in front of the small wall plaque.

A house on the corner of Broadwick and Marshall streets was the birthplace and childhood home of William Blake.

The street crosses, or meets, Wardour Street, Duck Lane, Berwick Street, Hopkins Street, Ingestre Place, Poland Street, Lexington Street, Dufours Place, Marshall Street and Carnaby Street.

Current businesses on Broadwick Street include Yauatcha, a noted Chinese restaurant.

Current occupants 
 No. 6: Agent Provocateur
 Nos. 15–17: Yauatcha
 No. 25: temper soho
 No. 31: itsu
 No. 33: Hearst Corporation
 No. 35: Pret a Manger
 No. 39: John Snow pub
 No. 71: Ooyala
 No. 72: Hearst Corporation

Former occupants 
Nos. 48 & 50, Padgett & Braham Ltd. and Wakely & Wheeler Ltd, goldsmiths & silversmiths. Also at the same premises were T & A Wise Ltd. engravers, and The Flutemakers Guild, makers of flutes in precious metals.

References

Streets in the City of Westminster
Streets in Soho